The Concert of The Hague, signed on 21 May 1659, was an outline of the common stance of England, France and the Dutch Republic regarding the Second Northern War. The powers agreed that the Swedish Empire and Denmark–Norway should settle for a peace treaty based on the Treaty of Roskilde, including free navigation through The Sound and the Baltic Sea based on the Treaty of Elbing. The subsequent Dano-Swedish Peace of Copenhagen largely followed the terms dictated by the Concert of the Hague.

The concert was preceded by two Dutch interventions against Sweden in the Second Northern War, the first being the relief of Danzig (Gdansk) in 1656 that led to the treaty of Elbing, the second being the relief of Copenhagen in 1658. The thriving force behind the treaty was Dutch Johan De Witt, protecting Dutch interests in the Baltic Sea, and the concert agreed to have the Dutch fleet enact pressure to impose the envisioned peace terms on Denmark and Sweden. England likewise had trade interests in the Baltic Sea and was willing to protect them by force. De Witt's attempts to turn the concert into a formal alliance was only in part successful, as negotiations with France resulted in a Franco-Dutch alliance in 1662 which became important during the Second Anglo-Dutch War, but negotiations with England did not result in an alliance due to disagreements over the freedom of seas.

Sources

References

Bibliography

Second Northern War
Treaties of the Dutch Republic
Treaties of England
1659 treaties
Treaties of the Kingdom of France
1659 in the Dutch Republic
1659 in England
1659 in France
17th century in The Hague
Dutch Republic–England relations
Dutch Republic–France relations
England–France relations